The Cairo International Film Festival is an annual internationally accredited film festival held in Cairo Opera House. It was established in 1976 and has taken place every year since its inception, except for 2011 and 2013, when it was cancelled due to budget limitations and political instability. It is the only international competitive feature film festival recognized by the FIAPF in the Arab world and Africa, as well as the oldest in this category.

History
The Cairo International Film Festival (CIFF) is one of only 15 Festivals accorded as a category "A" status by the  International Federation of Film Producers Associations FIAPF. It is the oldest internationally accredited cultural feature film festival in the Arab World, Africa and the Middle East.

The history of CIFF goes back to 1975, after a visit to the Berlin Film Festival the late writer-critic Kamal El Mallakh and a group of like-minded cinema critics wondered why such a world-class festival couldn't take place in Egypt. The country was still in Egyptian cinema's "Golden Age" and contained a formidable film industry, still the biggest in the Arab world. The Cairo International Film Festival was launched in 1976.

The 1976 festival featured around 100 films from 33 countries, with 14 films from 14 different countries in competition. In an effort to celebrate the best international cinema, the Cairo International Film Festival has proven its versatility year after year and continues to act as a meeting point, not only for filmmakers and critics, but also for writers, intellectuals, and other artists.

The Egyptian Association of Film Writers and Critics headed the festival for the first seven years until 1983. In the following year, the Union of Artist's Syndicates supervised the festival, and after that point, several associations mustered their resources to run the festival. The Egyptian Association of Film Writers and Critics joined with the Ministry of Culture and the Union of Artist's Syndicates to form a joint committee in 1985 to improve the quality and financial state of the festival.

Awards
The highest and most prestigious award given at CIFF is the Golden Pyramid Award awarded for Best Picture.

Silver Pyramid and Bronze Pyramid Awards go to the Best Director and Best New Director respectively.

The Best Screenplay award is named after the Nobel Prize winner Naguib Mahfouz.

The festival also offers career achievement awards named after iconic Egyptian actress Faten Hamama.

The International Federation of Film Critics (FIPRESCI) Awards are announced at the closing ceremony of the festival.

The festival offers awards in specialized categories as well:

 The Horizons of Arab Cinema Competition, presented by the Egyptian Filmmakers Syndicate (EFMS), offers the Saad Eldin Wahba Award for Best Arabic Film and the Salah Abu Seif Award for Best Arab Artistic Contribution.
The International Critics Week Competition for Feature and Documentary Films,  presented by the Egyptian Film Critics Association (EFCA), offers the Shadi Abdel Salam Award for Best Film, awarded to the Director, and the Fathy Farag Award for Best Artistic Contribution, both awards.
 Cinema of Tomorrow, International Competition (CTIC) for Short Films offers the Youssef Chahine Award for Best Short Film, and The Special Jury Award.
The Special Jury Award.

CIFF cash awards
Youssef Cherif Rizkallah Award (Audience Award): 20,000$ (shared between the producer of the film and the Egyptian company distributing the film in Egypt). The Award will be granted to one of films selected in the International Competition
Best Arab Film Award: 15,000$ presented to the producer of the film. The Award will be granted by a special jury to the best Arab film selected in either the International Competition.

The International Federation of Film Critics
The FIPRESCI Award is decided by a jury composed of a president and two members, and is awarded to a film in the international competition.  The Award is announced during the CIFF closing ceremony.

Cairo Film Connection 
The Cairo Film Connection is the latest co-production platform aiming at maximizing networking to induce coproductions for films originating from the Arab world. The first year, around 10 projects will be selected by a team of experts. Directors and producers will be invited to the Cairo Film Connection to pitch their projects over a period of 3 days to key industry professionals whether international or from the region. Circulation of the selected project in Arabic and English as well as, individualized meetings scheduled in advance should maximize exposure of the projects and optimize all the participants' experiences. Guests will be carefully selected to cover all stages of development of film production, funding, distribution, marketing, broadcasting, sales, festivals. In addition to the exposure offered to filmmakers during the Cairo Film Connection, the Egyptian Ministry of Culture is offering a special award amounting to $10,000.

Other festival sections 

 Festival of Festivals - Screening the most important, reviewed and awarded feature and documentary films that participated in other renowned prominent international film festivals as Cannes Film Festival, Berlin Film Festival, Venice Film Festival and others.
 International Panorama - Screening different variety of international movies from all over the World.
 New Egyptian Cinema - Screening new Egyptian Movies produced and premiered in 2016/17.
 Feature Film Classics - Screening tens of international film Classics.
 Film Tributes - Giving tribute and honoring international and local film icons.
 Guest of Honor Film Week, from World Cinema - Screening films of a guest country, chosen annually in honoring World Cinema.

Notable awards and honorees
The Cairo International Film Festival, in its annual celebration and examination of the state of cinema in the world today, has awarded many Egyptian and internationally renowned actors, actresses, and directors. Special awards, such as the Best Arab Film Award, is awarded to the most exceptional regional films of the year.

Major award winners

International actors awarded include Marcello Mastroianni, Catherine Deneuve, John Malkovich, Elizabeth Taylor, Morgan Freeman, Sivaji Ganesan, Samuel L. Jackson, Sophia Loren, Claudia Cardinale, Leslie Caron, Richard Gere, Susan Sarandon, Gina Lollobrigida, Peter O'Toole, Omar Sharif, Ornella Muti, Victoria Abril, Shashi Kapoor, Alain Delon, Nicolas Cage, Goldie Hawn, Kurt Russell, Greta Scacchi, Julia Ormond, Mira Sorvino, Khalid Abdalla, Alicia Silverstone, Priscilla Presley, Stuart Townsend, Yolande Moreau, Christopher Lee, Irene Papas, Nora Aunor, Bud Spencer, Tom Berenger, Salma Hayek, Lucy Liu, Juliette Binoche, Dominique Blanc, Charlize Theron, Hilary Swank and Adrien Brody.

Internationally renowned directors awarded include Robert Wise, Elia Kazan, Vanessa Redgrave, Oliver Stone, Roland Joffe, Carlos Saura, Ismail Merchant, Moustapha Akkad, Gadalla Gubara and Michelangelo Antonioni.

The CIFF 2004 Best Arab Film Award was given to an Egyptian film, Inas El-Degheidy's Searching for Freedom. In 2005 the CIFF honored its two star guests, American actor Morgan Freeman and French actress Leslie Caron. There was a screening of American actor and director Clint Eastwood's Million Dollar Baby starring Freeman, Eastwood and Hilary Swank; and American director Vincent Minnelli's classic musical An American in Paris (1951), starring Caron and Gene Kelly. CIFF's other 2005 honorees included Mohamed Mounir and Hanan Turk for their roles in Lebanese director Jocelyne Saab's Dunia (2005 film), a controversial film focusing on censorship and the oppression of women in Egypt. The Syrian-American producer and director Moustapha Akkad, who died in a 2005 terrorist attack in Amman, Jordan, was also honored that year. He is best remembered for Mohammad, Messenger of God  (1976) (U.S. The Message) about the early days of Islam, and for the spine-chilling Halloween movie series.

References

External links 
 
 Cairo International Film Festival at the Internet Movie Database
History and background to the Cairo International Film Festival

 
1976 establishments in Egypt
Annual events in Egypt
Film festivals established in 1976
African film festivals
Autumn events in Egypt